The Church of Our Merciful Saviour in Louisville, Kentucky was established in 1891. The church is located at 473 South 11th Street in Louisville's near west end. This historic church was built in the Late Gothic Revival style and was placed on the National Register of Historic Places in 1983. Today the church is active member parish of the Episcopal Diocese of Kentucky and serves mostly the African American community.

The congregation took the name Church of Our Merciful Saviour in 1873.  After an 1890-built building was destroyed in a fire in 1912, the present church was built.  The building's design is tentatively attributed to Bertram Goodhue and has been asserted to be similar to his
Trinity Episcopal Church in Asheville, North Carolina.

The church was sponsor of the first Boy Scout Troop for Negro boys in the United States in 1916.

References

External links
Jefferson County NRHP

Churches on the National Register of Historic Places in Kentucky
Gothic Revival church buildings in Kentucky
Churches completed in 1912
20th-century Episcopal church buildings
Roman Catholic churches in Louisville, Kentucky
Local landmarks in Louisville, Kentucky
Episcopal church buildings in Kentucky
African-American history in Louisville, Kentucky
1891 establishments in Kentucky
National Register of Historic Places in Louisville, Kentucky
Religious organizations established in 1891
1912 establishments in Kentucky